Minolia ceraunia is a species of minute sea snail, a marine gastropod mollusk in the family Solariellidae.

Description
The height of the shell attains 3 mm, its diameter 5 mm. The white, solid, deeply umbilicated shell has a depressed shape. It is slightly transversely furrowed. The shell contains four whorls, with the last one rapidly increasing in size. It is distinguished by regular longitudinal flame markings becoming small, paler, and more zigzagged, below the somewhat angled periphery, and all uniting round the umbilicus in a red band. The aperture is ovate-triangular. The lip is simple. The columellar margin is thickened.

Distribution
This marine species occurs off the Philippines.

References

External links
 

ceraunia
Gastropods described in 1891